The Kid and the Brute is an album by American jazz saxophonists Illinois Jacquet and Ben Webster recorded in late 1954 and released on the Clef label.

Reception

Allmusic reviewer Scott Yanow described the album as "An excellent example of Illinois Jacquet's hard-swinging and accessible music". in JazzTimes, Stanley Dance observed: "The two long blues on which Ben Webster plays are by far the most exciting tracks. Opening the record on the first, he lays down a ferocious challenge, but Jacquet, who in no way appears intimidated by the huffing and puffing, replies in an alert, sparring fashion that contrasts his leaner sound effectively. Jacquet opens on the second, their subsequent exchanges having rare, toe-to-toe intensity, as befits two of the swingingest tenors there have ever been".

Track listing
All compositions by Illinois Jacquet except as indicated
 "I Wrote This for the Kid" - 11:53
 "Saph" (Jacquet, Johnny Acea) - 2:42
 "Mambocito Mio" (Jacquet, Osie Johnson) - 2:51
 "The Kid and the Brute" - 8:26
 "September Song" (Kurt Weill, Maxwell Anderson) - 4:31
 "Jacquet's Dilemma" (Jacquet, Acea) - 3:09

Personnel 
Illinois Jacquet - tenor saxophone
Ben Webster - tenor saxophone (tracks 1 & 4)
Russell Jacquet - trumpet (tracks 2, 3, 5 & 6)
Matthew Gee - trombone (tracks 2, 3, 5 & 6)
Leo Parker - baritone saxophone (tracks 2, 3, 5 & 6)
Johnny Acea - piano
Al Lucas - bass
Osie Johnson - drums
Chano Pozo - congas (tracks 2, 3, 5 & 6)

References 

1956 albums
Illinois Jacquet albums
Ben Webster albums
Clef Records albums
Albums produced by Norman Granz